Mona Fong Yat-wah, Lady Shaw (27 July 1934 – 22 November 2017) was a Hong Kong film and television producer and production manager. She was born Li Menglan in Shanghai.

Career 
Fong achieved fame as one of the most popular nightclub singers and recording artists in Singapore and Hong Kong in the 1950s, especially singing English covers of top hits of the time. She married media mogul Sir Run Run Shaw (his second marriage) and became Deputy Chairman and General Manager of Shaw Brothers Studio and Television Broadcasts Limited (TVB).

Fong produced over a hundred films, the final one of which was Drunken Monkey in 2002. Effective 1 January 2009, she was appointed General Manager of TVB. Fong retired from TVB in 2012.

Recordings
One of her albums from Hong Kong The Voice of Mona Fong also referred to as Mona Fong Meets Carding Cruz featured arrangements by Celso Carrillo and the songs "Karoi Sakurambo", "Millionaire", "Wooden Heart" and "Delilah". It was released on Hong Kong's Diamond Records label. In 1968 an EP Merry Christmas was released on the Pathé label. It also featured Tsin Tsing and Betty Chung. One of her biggest original hits was the title song to the 1966 film, "The Blue and the Black" (藍與黑).

Filmography

Films 
This is a partial list of films.

 1957 Mambo Girl - Fong Yat-Wah
 1967 Sing High, Sing Low 
 1969 Diary of a Lady-Killer - Singer
 1978 Legend of the Bat - Producer	 
 1978 The Cunning Hustler - Producer	 	 
 1978 Godfather's Fury - Producer
 1982 Cat Vs. Rat - Producer

References

External links

Hong Kong Cinemagic: Mona Fong Yat Wah
 Mona Fong at senscritique.com

1934 births
2017 deaths
Hong Kong film producers
Shaw Brothers Studio
TVB
Businesspeople from Shanghai
Singers from Shanghai
Chinese women film producers
Wives of knights